Drillia kophameli is a species of sea snail, a marine gastropod mollusk in the family Drilliidae.

Description
The shell grows to a length of 9.5 mm.

Distribution
This species occurs in the demersal zone of the Strait of Magellan.

References

  Strebel, Beiträge zur Kenntnis der Molluskenfauna der  Magalhaen-Provinz; Jena,Gustav Fischer,1904-1907 
  Tucker, J.K. 2004 Catalog of recent and fossil turrids (Mollusca: Gastropoda). Zootaxa 682:1–1295

External links

kophameli
Gastropods described in 1905